Tyndallhydrus caraboides is a species of beetle in the family Dytiscidae, the only species in the genus Tyndallhydrus.

References

Dytiscidae